Deviant Behavior is a peer-reviewed academic journal which focuses on social deviance, including criminal, sexual, and narcotic behaviors. It is published by Routledge and was established in 1979. According to the Journal Citation Reports, the journal has a 2016 impact factor of 1.052, ranking it 48 out of 62 journals in the category "Psychology, Social" and 67 out of 143 journals in the category "Sociology".

References

External links 
 

Sexology journals
Monthly journals
Taylor & Francis academic journals
English-language journals
Publications established in 1979